Aliyah is a given name. Notable people with the name include:

Aliyah Abrams (born 1997), Guyanese sprinter 
Aliyah Boston (born 2001), American basketball player
Aliyah O'Brien (born 1981), Canadian actress
Aliyah Saleem (born 1989), British secular education campaigner
Aliyah Khalaf Saleh (born c. 1956), Iraqi humanitarian

See also
Aaliyah (given name)
Aliya, given name